Shunarak (Şunarak) is a rural locality (a selo) in Turochaksky District, the Altai Republic, Russia. The population was 33 as of 2016. There is 1 street.

Geography 
Shunarak is located 41 km northwest of Turochak (the district's administrative centre) by road. Ozero-Kureyevo is the nearest rural locality.

References 

Rural localities in Turochaksky District